Dimitrios Muller was a Greek athlete. He competed in the men's triple jump at the 1908 Summer Olympics.

References

Year of birth missing
Year of death missing
Athletes (track and field) at the 1906 Intercalated Games
Athletes (track and field) at the 1908 Summer Olympics
Greek male triple jumpers
Olympic athletes of Greece
Place of birth missing
20th-century Greek people